Safed (known in Hebrew as Tzfat; Sephardic Hebrew & Modern Hebrew: צְפַת Tsfat, Ashkenazi Hebrew: Tzfas, Biblical Hebrew: Ṣǝp̄aṯ; , Ṣafad), is a city in the Northern District of Israel.

Safed has been identified with Sepph, a fortified town in the Upper Galilee mentioned in the writings of the Roman Jewish historian Josephus. The Jerusalem Talmud mentions Safed as one of five elevated spots where fires were lit to announce the New Moon and festivals during the Second Temple period. Safed attained local prominence under the Crusaders, who built a large fortress there in 1168. It was conquered by Saladin 20 years later, and demolished by his grandnephew al-Mu'azzam Isa in 1219. After reverting to the Crusaders in a treaty in 1240, a larger fortress was erected, which was expanded and reinforced in 1268 by the Mamluk sultan Baybars, who developed Safed into a major town and the capital of a new province spanning the Galilee. After a century of general decline, the stability brought by the Ottoman conquest in 1517 ushered in nearly a century of growth and prosperity in Safed, during which time Jewish immigrants from across Europe developed the city into a center for wool and textile production and the mystical Kabbalah movement. It became known as one of the Four Holy Cities of Judaism. As the capital of the Safad Sanjak, it was the main population center of the Galilee, with large Muslim and Jewish communities. Besides during the fortunate governorship of Fakhr al-Din II in the early 17th century, the city underwent a general decline and by the mid-18th century was eclipsed by Acre. Its Jewish residents were targeted in Druze and local Muslim raids in the 1830s, and many perished in an earthquake in that same decade. 

Safed's population reached 24,000 toward the end of the 19th century; it was a mixed city, divided roughly equally between Jews and Muslims with a small Christian community. Its Muslim merchants played a key role as middlemen in the grain trade between the local farmers and the traders of Acre, while the Ottomans promoted the city as a center of Sunni jurisprudence. Safed's conditions improved considerably in the late 19th century, with its municipal council founded along with a number of banks, though the city's jurisdiction was limited to the Upper Galilee. Through the philanthropy of Moses Montefiore, its Jewish synagogues and homes were rebuilt. Around the start of British Mandatory rule, in 1922, Safed's population had dropped to around 8,700, roughly 60% Muslim, 33% Jewish and the remainder Christians. Amid rising ethnic tension throughout Palestine, Safed's Jews were attacked in an Arab riot in 1929. The city's population had risen to 13,700 by 1948, overwhelmingly Arab, though the city was proposed to be part of a Jewish state in the 1947 UN Partition Plan. During the 1948 war, Jewish paramilitary forces captured the city after heavy fighting, precipitating the flight of all of Safed's Palestinian Arabs, such that today the city has an almost exclusively Jewish population. 

Safed has a large Haredi community and remains a center for Jewish religious studies. Due to its high elevation, the city has warm summers and cold, often snowy, winters. Its mild climate and scenic views have made Safed a popular holiday resort frequented by Israelis and foreign visitors.

Biblical reference
Legend has it that Safed was founded by a son of Noah after the Great Flood. According to the Book of Judges, the area where Safed is located was assigned to the tribe of Naphtali.

It has been suggested that Jesus' assertion that "a city that is set on a hill cannot be hidden"  may have referred to Safed.

History

Antiquity
Safed has been identified with Sepph, a fortified town in the Upper Galilee mentioned in the writings of the Roman-Jewish historian Josephus. Safed is mentioned in the Jerusalem Talmud as one of five elevated spots where fires were lit to announce the New Moon and festivals during the Second Temple period.

Crusader era

Pre-Crusader village and tower

There is scarce information about Safed before the Crusader conquest. A document from the Cairo Geniza, composed in 1034, mentions a transaction made in Tiberias in 1023 by a certain Jew, Musa ben Hiba ben Salmun with the nisba (Arabic descriptive suffix) "al-Safati" (of Safed), indicating the presence of a Jewish community living alongside Muslims in Safed in the 11th century. According to the Muslim historian Ibn Shaddad (d. 1285), at the beginning of the 12th century, a "flourishing village" beneath a tower called Burj Yatim had existed at the site of Safed on the eve of the Crusaders' capture of the area in 1101–1102 and that "nothing" about the village was mentioned in "the early Islamic history books". Although Ibn Shaddad mistakenly attributes the tower's construction to the Knights Templar, the modern historian Ronnie Ellenblum asserts that the tower was likely built during the early Muslim period (mid-7th–11th centuries).

First Crusader period
The Frankish chronicler William of Tyre noted the presence of a burgus (tower) in Safed, which he called "Castrum Saphet" or "Sephet", in 1157. Safed was the seat of a castellany (area governed by a castle) by at least 1165, when its castellan (appointed castle governor) was Fulk, constable of Tiberias. The castle of Safed was purchased from Fulk by King Amalric of Jerusalem in 1168. He subsequently reinforced the castle and transferred it to the Templars in the same year. Theoderich the Monk, describing his visit to the area in 1172, noted that the expanded fortification of the castle of Safed was meant to check the raids of the Turks (the Turkic Zengid dynasty ruled the area east of the Kingdom). Testifying to the considerable expansion of the castle, the chronicler Jacques de Vitry (d. 1240) wrote that it was practically built anew. The remains of Fulk's castle can now be found under the citadel excavations, on a hill above the old city.

According to Barbé, its western boundary straddled the domains of Acre, including the fief of St. George de la Beyne, which included Sajur and Beit Jann, and the fief of Geoffrey le Tor, which included Akbara and Hurfeish, and in the southwest ran north of Maghar and Sallama. Its northern boundary was marked by the Nahal Dishon (Wadi al-Hindaj) stream, its southern boundary was likely formed near Wadi al-Amud, separating it from the fief of Tiberias, while its eastern limits were the marshes of the Hula Valley and upper Jordan Valley. There were several Jewish communities in the castellany of Safed, as testified in the accounts of Jewish pilgrims and chroniclers between 1120 and 1293. Benjamin of Tudela, who visited the town in 1170, does not record any Jews living in Safed proper.

Ayyubid interregnum
Safed was captured by the Ayyubids led by Sultan Saladin in 1188 after a month-long siege, following the Battle of Hattin in 1187. Saladin ultimately allowed its residents to relocate to Tyre. He granted Safed and Tiberias as an iqta (akin to a fief) to Sa'd al-Din Mas'ud ibn Mubarak (d. 1211), the son of his niece, after which it was bequeathed to Sa'd al-Din's son Ahmad. Samuel ben Samson, who visited the town in 1210, mentions the existence of a Jewish community of at least fifty there. He also noted that two Muslims guarded and maintained the cave tomb of a rabbi, Hanina ben Horqano, in Safed. The iqta of Safed was taken from the family of Sa'd al-Din by the Ayyubid emir of Damascus, al-Mu'azzam Isa, in 1217. Two years later, during the Crusader siege of Damietta, al-Mu'azzam Isa had the Safed castle demolished to prevent its capture and reuse by potential future Crusaders.

Second Crusader period
As an outcome of the treaty negotiations between the Crusader leader Theobald I of Navarre and the Ayyubid emir of Damascus, al-Salih Isma'il, in 1240 Safed once again passed to Crusader control. Afterward, the Templars were tasked with rebuilding the town's fortress, with efforts spearheaded by Benoît d'Alignan, Bishop of Marseille. The rebuilding is recorded in a short treatise, De constructione castri Saphet, from the early 1260s. The reconstruction was completed at the considerable expense of 40,000 bezants in 1243. The new fortress was larger than the original, with a capacity for 2,200 soldiers in time of war, and with a resident force of 1,700 in peacetime. The garrison's goods and services were provided by the town or large village growing rapidly beneath the fortress, which, according to Benoit's account, contained a market, "numerous inhabitants" and was protected by the fortress. The settlement also benefited from trade with travelers on the route between Acre and the Jordan Valley, which passed through Safed.

Mamluk period

The Ayyubids of Egypt had been supplanted by the Mamluks in 1250 and the Mamluk sultan Baybars entered Syria with his army in 1261. Thereafter, he led a series of campaigns over several years against Crusader strongholds across the Syrian coastal mountains. Safed, with its position overlooking the Jordan River and allowing the Crusaders early warnings of Muslim troop movements in the area, had been a consistent aggravation for the Muslim regional powers. After a six-week siege, Baybars captured Safed in July 1266, after which he had nearly the entire garrison killed. The siege occurred during a Mamluk military campaign to subdue Crusader strongholds in Palestine and followed a failed attempt to capture the Crusaders' coastal stronghold of Acre. Unlike the Crusader fortresses along the coastline, which were demolished upon their capture by the Mamluks, Baybars spared the fortress of Safed. He likely preserved it because of the strategic value stemming from its location on a high mountain and its isolation from other Crusader fortresses. Moreover, Baybars determined that in the event of a renewed Crusader invasion of the coastal region, a strongly fortified Safed could serve as an ideal headquarters to confront the Crusader threat. In 1268, he had the fortress repaired, expanded and strengthened. He commissioned numerous building works in the town of Safed, including caravanserais, markets and baths, and converted the town's church into a mosque. The mosque, called Jami al-Ahmar (the Red Mosque), was completed in 1275. By the end of Baybars's reign, Safed had developed into a prosperous town and fortress.

Baybars assigned fifty-four mamluks, at the head of whom was Emir Ala al-Din Kandaghani, to oversee the management of Safed and its dependencies. From the time of its capture, the city was made the administrative center of Mamlakat Safad, one of seven mamlakas (provinces), whose governors were typically appointed from Cairo, which made up Mamluk Syria. Initially, its jurisdiction corresponded roughly with the Crusader castellany. After the fall of the Montfort Castle to the Mamluks in 1271, the castle and its dependency, the Shaghur district, were incorporated into Mamlakat Safad. The territorial jurisdiction of the mamlaka eventually spanned the entire Galilee and the lands further south down to Jenin.

The geographer al-Dimashqi, who died in Safed in 1327, wrote around 1300 that Baybars built a "round tower and called it Kullah ..." after leveling the old fortress. The tower was built in three stories, and provided with provisions, halls, and magazines. Under the structure, a cistern collected enough rainwater to regularly supply the garrison. The governor of Safed, Emir Baktamur al-Jukandar (the Polomaster), built a mosque later called after him in the northeastern section of the city. The geographer Abu'l Fida (1273–1331), the ruler of Hama, described Safed as follows:[Safed] was a town of medium size. It has a very strongly built castle, which dominates the Lake of Tabariyyah [Sea of Galilee]. There are underground watercourses, which bring drinking-water up to the castle-gate...Its suburbs cover three hills... Since the place was conquered by Al Malik Adh Dhahir [Baybars] from the Franks [Crusaders], it has been made the central station for the troops who guard all the coast-towns of that district."

The native qadi (Islamic head judge) of Safed, Shams al-Din al-Uthmani, composed a text about Safed called Ta'rikh Safad (the History of Safed) during the rule of its governor Emir Alamdar. The extant parts of the work consisted of ten folios largely devoted to Safed's distinguishing qualities, its dependent villages, agriculture, trade and geography, with no information about its history. His account reveals the city's dominant features were its citadel, the Red Mosque and its towering position over the surrounding landscape. He noted Safed lacked "regular urban planning", madrasas (schools of Islamic law), ribats (hostels for military volunteers) and defensive walls, and that its houses were clustered in disarray and its streets were not distinguishable from its squares. He attributed the city's shortcomings to the dearth of generous patrons. A device for transporting buckets of water called the satura existed in the city mainly to supply the soldiers of the citadel; surplus water was distributed to the city's residents. Al-Uthmani praised the natural beauty of Safed, its therapeutic air, and noted that its residents took strolls in the surrounding gorges and ravines.

The Black Death brought about a decline in the population in Safed from 1348 onward. There is little available information about the city and its dependencies during the last century of Mamluk rule, though travelers' accounts describe a general decline precipitated by famine, plagues, natural disasters and political instability.

Ottoman era

Sixteenth-century prosperity

The Ottomans conquered Mamluk Syria following their victory at the Battle of Marj Dabiq in northern Syria in 1516. Safed's inhabitants sent the keys of the town citadel to Sultan Selim I after he captured Damascus. No fighting was recorded around Safed, which was bypassed by Selim's army on the way to Mamluk Egypt. The sultan had placed the district of Safed under the jurisdiction of the Mamluk governor of Damascus, Janbirdi al-Ghazali, who defected to the Ottomans. Rumors in 1517 that Selim was slain by the Mamluks precipitated a revolt against the newly-appointed Ottoman governor by the townspeople of Safed, which resulted in wide-scale killings, many of which targeted the city's Jews, who were viewed as sympathizers of the Ottomans. Safed became the capital of the Safed Sanjak, roughly corresponding with Mamlakat Safad but excluding most of the Jezreel Valley and the area of Atlit, part of the larger province of Damascus Eyalet.

In 1525/26, the population of Safed consisted of 633 Muslim families, 40 Muslim bachelors, 26 Muslim religious persons, nine Muslim disabled, 232 Jewish families, and 60 military families. In 1549, under Sultan Suleiman the Magnificent, a wall was constructed and troops were garrisoned to protect the city. In 1553/54, the population consisted of 1,121 Muslim households, 222 Muslim bachelors, 54 Muslim religious leaders, 716 Jewish households, 56 Jewish bachelors, and 9 disabled persons. At least in the 16th century, Safed was the only kasaba (city) in the sanjak and in 1555 was divided into nineteen mahallas (quarters), seven Muslim and twelve Jewish. The total population of Safed rose from 926 households in 1525–26 to 1,931 households in 1567–1568. Among these, the Jewish population rose from a mere 233 households in 1525 to 945 households in 1567–1568. The Muslim quarters were Sawawin, located west of the fortress; Khandaq (the moat); Ghazzawiyah, which had likely been settled by Gazans; Jami' al-Ahmar (the Red Mosque), located south of the fortress and named for the local mosque; al-Akrad, which dated to the Middle Ages and continued to exist through the 19th century, and whose inhabitants were mostly Kurds; al-Wata (the lower), the southernmost quarter of Safed and situated below the city; and al-Suq, named after the market or mosque located within the quarter. The Jewish quarters were all situated west of the fortress. Each quarter was named for the place of origin of its inhabitants: Purtuqal (Portugal), Qurtubah (Cordoba), Qastiliyah (Castille), Musta'rib (Jews of local, Arabic-speaking origin), Magharibah (northwestern Africa), Araghun ma' Qatalan (Aragon and Catalonia), Majar (Hungary), Puliah (Apulia), Qalabriyah (Calabria), Sibiliyah (Seville), Taliyan (Italian) and Alaman (German).

In the 15th and 16th centuries there were a number of well-known Sufi (Muslim mysticism) followers of Ibn Arabi living in Safed. The Sufi sage Ahmad al-Asadi (1537–1601) established a zawiya (Sufi lodge) called Sadr Mosque in the city. Safed became a center of Kabbalah (Jewish mysticism) during the 16th century.

After the expulsion of the Jews from Spain in 1492, many prominent rabbis found their way to Safed, among them the Kabbalists Isaac Luria and Moshe Kordovero; Joseph Caro, the author of the Shulchan Aruch and Shlomo Halevi Alkabetz, composer of the Sabbath hymn "Lecha Dodi". The influx of Sephardi Jews—reaching its peak under the rule of Sultans Suleiman the Magnificent and Selim II—made Safed a global center for Jewish learning and a regional center for trade throughout the 15th and 16th centuries. Sephardi Jews and other Jewish immigrants by then outnumbered the indigenous (Musta'rib) Jews in the city. During this period, the Jews developed the textile industry in Safed, transforming the town into an important and lucrative centre for wool production and textile manufacturing. There were more than 7,000 Jews in Safed in 1576 when Murad III issued an edict for the forced deportation of 1,000 wealthy Jewish families to Cyprus to boost the island's economy. There is no evidence that the edict, or a second one issued the following year for the removal of 500 families, was enforced. A Hebrew printing press, the first in Western Asia, was established in Safed in 1577 by Eliezer Ashkenazi and his son, Isaac of Prague. In 1584, there were 32 synagogues registered in the town.

Political decline, attacks and natural disasters

By the early part of the 17th century, Safed was a small town. In 1602 the paramount chief of the Druze in Mount Lebanon, Fakhr al-Din of the Ma'n dynasty, was appointed the sanjak-bey (district governor) of Safed, in addition to his governorship of neighboring Sidon-Beirut Sanjak to the north. In the preceding years, the Safed Sanjak had entered a state of ruin and desolation, and was often the scene of conflict between the local Druze and Shia Muslim peasants and the Ottoman authorities. By 1605 Fakhr al-Din had established peace and security in the sanjak, with highway brigandage and Bedouin raids having ceased under his watch. Trade and agriculture consequently thrived and the population prospered. He formed close relations with the city's Sunni Muslim ulema (religious scholars), particularly the mufti Ahmad al-Khalidi of the Hanafi fiqh (school of jurisprudence), who became his practical court historian. Fakhr al-Din was driven into European exile by the Ottomans in 1613, but his son Ali became governor in 1615. Fakhr al-Din returned to his domains in 1618 and five years later regained the governorship of Safed, which the Ma'ns had lost, after his victory against the governor of Damascus at the Battle of Anjar. In , the orientalist Quaresmius spoke of Safed being inhabited "chiefly by Hebrews, who had their synagogues and schools, and for whose sustenance contributions were made by the Jews in other parts of the world." According to the historian Louis Finkelstein, the Jewish community of Safed was plundered by the Druze under Mulhim ibn Yunus, nephew of Fakhr al-Din. Five years later, Fakhr al-Din was routed by the Ottoman governor of Damascus, Mulhim abandoned Safed, and its Jewish residents returned.

The Druze again attacked the Jews of Safed in 1656. During the power struggle between Fakhr al-Din's heirs (1658–1667), each faction attacked Safed. In 1660, in the turmoil following the death of Mulhim, the Druze destroyed Safed with only a few of the former Jewish residents returning to the city by 1662. Safed Sanjak and the neighboring Sidon-Beirut Sanjak to the north were administratively separated from Damascus in 1660 to form the Sidon Eyalet, of which Safed was briefly the capital. The province was created by the imperial government to check the power of the Druze of Mount Lebanon, as well as the Shia of Jabal Amil.

As nearby Tiberias remained desolate for several decades, Safed gained the key position among Galilean Jewish communities. In 1665, the Sabbatai Sevi movement is said to have arrived in the town. In the 1670s, the account of the Turkish traveler Evliya Çelebi recorded that Safed contained three caravanserais, several mosques, seven Sufi lodges and six public bathhouses.

The Tiberias-based sheikh Zahir al-Umar of the local Arab Zaydan clan, whose father Umar al-Zaydani had been the governor and tax farmer of Safed in 1702–1706, wrested control of Safed and its tax farm from its native strongman, Muhammad Naf'i, through military pressure and diplomacy by 1740. The Naf'i, Shahin, and Murad families continued to farm the taxes of Safed and its countryside into the 1760s as Zahir's subordinates. By the 1760s, Zahir entrusted Safed to his son Ali, who made the town his headquarters. After Zahir was killed by Ottoman imperial forces, the governor of Sidon, Jazzar Pasha, moved to oust Zahir's sons from their Galilee strongholds. Ali made a final, unsuccessful stand against Jazzar Pasha from Safed, which was afterward captured and garrisoned by the governor. The concomitant rise of Acre, established by Zahir as his capital in 1750 and which served as the capital of the Sidon Eyalet under Jazzar Pasha (1775–1804) and his successors, Sulayman Pasha al-Adil (1805–1819) and Abdullah Pasha (1820–1831), contributed to the political decline of Safed. It became a subdistrict center with limited local influence, belonging to the Acre Sanjak . 

Underdevelopment and a series of natural disasters further contributed to Safed's decline during the 17th–mid-19th centuries. An outbreak of plague decimated the population in 1742 and the Near East earthquakes of 1759 left the city in ruins, killing 200 residents. An influx of Russian Jews in 1776 and 1781, and of Lithuanian Jews of the Perushim movement in 1809 and 1810, reinvigorated the Jewish community. In 1812, another plague killed 80% of the Jewish population. Following Abdullah Pasha of Acre's ordered killing of his Jewish vizier Haim Farhi, who served the same post under Jazzar and Sulayman, the governor imprisoned the Jewish residents of Safed on 12 August 1820, accusing them of tax evasion under the concealment of Farhi; they were released upon paying a ransom. The war between Abdullah Pasha and the influential Farhi brothers in Constantinople and Damascus in 1822–1823 prompted Jewish flight from the Galilee in general, though by 1824 Jewish immigrants were steadily moving to the city.

The Egyptian forces of Muhammad Ali wrested control of the Levant from the Ottomans in 1831 and in the same year many Jews who had fled the Galilee, including Safed, under Abdullah Pasha returned as a result of Muhammad Ali's liberal policies toward Jews. Safed was raided by Druze in 1833 at the approach of Ibrahim Pasha, the Egyptian governor of the Levant. In the following year, the Muslim notables of the city, led by Salih al-Tarshihi, opposed to the Egyptian policy of conscription, joined the peasants' revolt in Palestine. During the revolt, rebels plundered the city for over thirty days. Emir Bashir Shihab II of Mount Lebanon and his Druze fighters entered its environs in support of the Egyptians and compelled Safed's leaders to surrender. The Galilee earthquake of 1837 killed about half of Safed's 4,000-strong Jewish community, destroyed all fourteen of its synagogues and prompted the flight of 600 Perushim for Jerusalem; the surviving Sephardic and Hasidic Jews mostly remained. Among the 2,158 residents of Safed who had died, 1,507 were Ottoman subjects, the rest foreign citizens. The Jewish community, whose quarter was situated on the hillside, had been particularly hard hit, the southern, Muslim section of the town experiencing considerably less damage. The following year, in 1838, Druze rebels and local Muslims raided Safed for three days.

Tanzimat reforms and revival

Ottoman rule was restored across the Levant in 1840. The Empire-wide Tanzimat reforms, which were first adopted in the 1840s, brought about a steady rise in Safed's population and economy. In 1849 Safed had a total estimated population of 5,000, of whom 2,940-3,440 were Muslims, 1,500-2,000 were Jews and 60 were Christians. The population was estimated at 7,000 in 1850–1855, of whom 2,500-3,000 were Jews. The Jewish population increased in the last half of the 19th century by immigration from Persia, Morocco, and Algeria. Moses Montefiore (d. 1885) visited Safed seven times and financed much of the rebuilding of Safed's synagogues and Jewish houses.

In 1864 the Sidon Eyalet was absorbed into the new province of Syria Vilayet. In the new province, Safed remained part of the Acre Sanjak and served as the center of a kaza (third-level subdivision), whose jurisdiction covered the villages around the city and the subdistrict of Mount Meron (Jabal Jarmaq). In the Ottoman survey of Syria in 1871, Safed had 1,395 Muslim households, 1,197 Jewish households and three Christian households. The survey recorded a relatively high number of businesses in the city, namely 227 shops, fifteen mills, fourteen bakeries and four olive oil factories, an indicator of Safed's long-established role as an economic hub for the people of the Upper Galilee, the Hula Valley, the Golan Heights and parts of modern-day South Lebanon. Through the late 19th century, Safed's merchants served as middlemen in the Galilee grain trade, selling the wheat, pulses and fruit grown by the peasants of the Galilee to the traders of Acre, who in turn exported at least part of the merchandise to Europe. Safed also maintained extensive trade with the port of Tyre. The bulk of trade in Safed, which was traditionally dominated by the city's Jews, largely passed to its Muslim merchants during the late 19th century, particularly trade with the local villagers; Muslim traders offered higher credit to the peasants and were able to obtain government assistance for debt repayments. The wealth of Safed's Muslims increased and a number of the city's leading Muslim families made an opportunity from the Ottoman Land Code of 1858 to purchase extensive tracts around Safed. The major Muslim landowning clans were the Soubeh, Murad and Qaddura. The latter owned about 50,000 dunams toward the end of the century, including eight villages around Safed.

In 1878 the municipal council of Safed was established. In 1888 the Acre Sanjak, including the Safed Kaza, became part of the new province of Beirut Vilayet, an administrative state of affairs which persisted until the Empire's fall in 1918. The centralization and stability brought by the imperial reforms solidified the political status and practical influence of Safed in the Upper Galilee. The Ottomans developed Safed into a center for Sunni Islam to counterbalance the influence of non-Muslim communities in its environs and the Shia Muslims of Jabal Amil. Along with the three major landowning families, the Muslim ulema (religious scholarly) families of Nahawi, Qadi, Mufti and Naqib comprised the urban elite (a'yan) of the city. The Sunni courts of Safed arbitrated over cases in Akbara, Ein al-Zeitun and as far away as Mejdel Islim. According to the late 19th-century account of British missionary E. W. G. Masterman, the Muslim families of Safed included Kurds, Damascenes, Algerians, Bedouin from the Jordan Valley, and people from the villages around Safed. Many Damascenes had been settled in the city by Baybars when he conquered Safed in 1266. Until the late 19th century the Muslims of Safed maintained strong social and cultural connections with Damascus. The government settled Algerian and Circassian exiles in the countryside of Safed in the 1860s and 1878, respectively, possibly in an effort to strengthen the Muslim character of the area. At least two Muslim families in the city itself, Arabi and Delasi, were of Algerian origin, though they accounted for a small proportion of the city's overall Muslim population. Masterman noted that the Muslims of Safed were conservative, "active and hardy", who "dress[ed] well and move[d] about more than the people from the region of southern Palestine". They lived mainly in three quarters of the city: al-Akrad, whose residents were mostly laborers, Sawawin, home to the Muslim a'yan households and the city's Catholic community, and al-Wata, whose inhabitants were largely shopkeepers and minor traders. The entire Jewish population lived in the Gharbieh (western) quarter.

Safed's population reached over 15,000 in 1879, 8,000 of whom were Muslims and 7,000 Jews. A population list from about 1887 showed that Safad had 24,615 inhabitants; 2,650 Jewish households, 2,129 Muslim households and 144 Roman Catholic households. Arab families in Safed whose social status rose as a result of the Tanzimat reforms included the Asadi, whose presence in Safed dated to the 16th century, Hajj Sa'id, Hijazi, Bisht, Hadid, Khouri, a Christian family whose progenitor moved to the city from Mount Lebanon during the 1860 civil war, and Sabbagh, a long-established Christian family in the city related to Zahir al-Umar's fiscal adviser Ibrahim al-Sabbagh; many members of these families became officials in the civil service, local administrations or businessmen. When the Ottomans established a branch of the Agricultural Bank in the city in 1897, all of its board members were resident Arabs, the most influential of whom were Husayn Abd al-Rahim Effendi, Hajj Ahmad al-Asadi, As'ad Khouri and Abd al-Latif al-Hajj Sa'id. The latter two also became board members of the Chamber of Commerce and Agriculture branch opened in Safed in 1900. In the last decade of the 19th century, Safed contained 2,000 houses, four mosques, three churches, two public bathhouses, one caravanserai, two public sabils, nineteen mills, seven olive oil presses, ten bakeries, fifteen coffeehouses, forty-five stalls and three shops.

British Mandate of Palestine

Safed was the centre of Safad Subdistrict. According to a census conducted in 1922 by the British Mandate authorities, Safed had a population of 8,761 inhabitants, consisting of 5,431 Muslims, 2,986 Jews, 343 Christians and others. Safed remained a mixed city during the British Mandate for Palestine and ethnic tensions between Jews and Arabs rose during the 1920s. During the 1929 Palestine riots, Safed and Hebron became major clash points. In the Safed massacre 20 Jewish residents were killed by local Arabs. Safed was included in the part of Palestine recommended to be included in the proposed Jewish state under the United Nations Partition Plan for Palestine.

By 1948 the city was home to about 12,000 Arabs and about 1,700 Jews, mostly religious and elderly. On 5 January 1948, Arabs attacked the Jewish Quarter. In February 1948, during the civil war, Muslim Arabs attacked a Jewish bus attempting to reach Safed, and the Jewish quarter of the town came under siege by the Muslims. British forces that were present did not intervene. According to Martin Gilbert, food supplies ran short. "Even water and flour were in desperately short supply. Each day, the Arab attackers drew closer to the heart of the Jewish quarter, systematically blowing up Jewish houses as they pressed in on the central area."

On April 16, the same day that British forces evacuated Safed, 200 local Arab militiamen, supported by over 200 Arab Liberation Army soldiers, tried to take over the city's Jewish Quarter. They were repelled by the Jewish garrison, consisting of some 200 Haganah fighters, men and women, boosted by a Palmach platoon.

The Palmach ground attack on the Arab section of Safed took place on 6 May, as a part of Operation Yiftah. The first phase of the Palmach plan to capture Safed, was to secure a corridor through the mountains by capturing the Arab village of Biriyya. The Arab Liberation Army had plans to take over the whole city on May 10 and to slaughter all as cabled by the Syrian commander al-Hassan Kam al-Maz, and in the meantime placed artillery pieces on a hill adjacent to the Jewish quarter and started its shelling. The Palmach's Third Battalion failed to take the main objective, the "citadel", but "terrified" the Arab population sufficiently to prompt further flight, as well as urgent appeals for outside help and an effort to obtain a truce.

The secretary-general of the Arab League Abdul Rahman Hassan Azzam stated that the goal of Plan Dalet was to drive out the inhabitants of Arab villages along the Syrian and Lebanese frontiers, particularly places on the roads by which Arab regular forces could enter the country. He noted that Acre and Safed were in particular danger. However, the appeals for help were ignored, and the British, now less than a week away from the end of the British Mandate of Palestine, also did not intervene against the second and final Haganah attack, which began on the evening of 9 May, with a mortar barrage on key sites in Safed. Following the barrage, Palmach infantry, in bitter fighting, took the citadel, Beit Shalva and the police fort, Safed's three dominant buildings. Through 10 May, Haganah mortars continued to pound the Arab neighbourhoods, causing fires in the marked area and in the fuel dumps, which exploded. "The Palmah 'intentionally left open the exit routes for the population to "facilitate" their exodus...' " According to Gilbert, "The Arabs of Safed began to leave, including the commander of the Arab forces, Adib Shishakli (later Prime Minister of Syria). With the police fort on Mount Canaan isolated, its defenders withdrew without fighting. The fall of Safed was a blow to Arab morale throughout the region... With the invasion of Palestine by regular Arab armies believed to be imminent – once the British had finally left in eleven or twelve days' time – many Arabs felt that prudence dictated their departure until the Jews had been defeated and they could return to their homes.

Some 12,000 Arabs, with some estimates reaching 15,000, fled Safed and were a "heavy burden on the Arab war effort". Among them was the family of Palestinian Authority President Mahmoud Abbas. The city was fully under the control of Jewish paramilitary forces by May 11, 1948.

Early in June, Jewish dignitaries from Safed journeyed to Tel Aviv to ask the government to block the return of Arabs to the city, threatening to abandon it if the latter were allowed back. They reasoned that since most of the Arabs' property had been seized or stolen in the meantime, the Jewish community would be unable to withstand the pressure of the returnees' demands for restitution.

State of Israel
In 1974, 25 Israeli Jews (mainly school children) from Safed, were killed in the Ma'alot massacre. Over 1990s and early 2000s, the town accepted thousands of Russian Jewish immigrants and Ethiopian Beta Israel. In July 2006, "Katyusha" rockets fired by Hezbollah from Southern Lebanon hit Safed, killing one man and injuring others. Many residents fled the town for the duration of the conflict. On July 22, four people were injured in a rocket attack.

The town has retained its unique status as a Jewish studies centre, incorporating numerous facilities. In 2010, eighteen senior rabbis led by the chief rabbi of Safed, Shmuel Eliyahu, issued an edict urging the city's residents not to rent or sell property to Arabs, warning of an "Arab takeover"; Arabs constitute a fractional proportion of the population, and the statement was generally perceived to be directed at the 1,300 Arab students enrolled at Zefat Academic College.

Demographics 
In 2008, the population of Safed was 32,000. According to CBS figures in 2001, the ethnic makeup of the city was 99.2% Jewish and non-Arab, with no significant Arab population. 43.2% of the residents were 19 years of age or younger, 13.5% between 20 and 29, 17.1% between 30 and 44, 12.5% from 45 to 59, 3.1% from 60 to 64, and 10.5% 65 years of age or older.

The city is home to a relatively large community of Haredi Jews. The village of Akbara in the city's southwestern outskirts, which had a population of about 500 Arab Muslims, most of whom belonged to a single clan, the Halihal, is under Safed's municipal jurisdiction.

Mayors 
1948 - 1955 - 

1955 - 1965 - 

1965 - 1967 - Meir Meiber

1967 - 1971 - Yakov Hopert

1971 - 1973 - Eli Kadosh

1973 - 1983 - Aharon-Raphael Nahmias

1983 - 1993 - Zeev Perl

1993 - 1998 - Moshe Hania

1998 - 2001 - Yossef Oz

2001 - 2003 - Oded Hameiri

2003 - 2008 - Yishai Maimon

2008 - 2018 - Ilan Shohat

2018 - present - Shuki Ohana

Seismology 
The city is located above the Dead Sea Transform, and is one of the cities in Israel most at risk of earthquakes (along with Tiberias, Beit She'an, Kiryat Shmona, and Eilat).

Geography

Climate 
Safed has a Mediterranean climate (Köppen climate classification: Csa) with hot, dry summers and cool, rainy and occasionally snowy winters. The city receives  of precipitation per year. Winters are cool and wet, and precipitation is occasionally in the form of snow.

Education 

According to CBS, the city has 25 schools and 6,292 students. There are 18 elementary schools with a student population of 3,965, and 11 high schools with a student population of 2,327. 40.8% of Safed's 12th graders were eligible for a matriculation (bagrut) certificate in 2001. The Zefat Academic College, originally an extension of Bar-Ilan University, was granted independent accreditation by Israel's Council of Higher Education in 2007. For the 2011–2012 school year, the college began a program designed specifically for Haredi Judaism. It was created in order to allow haredi women living in the Upper Galilee access to higher education, while still maintaining strict religious practice. The program accomplishes this goal through separate classes for male and female students. The classes are also taught during certain hours as to allow women to fulfill other aspects of their religiosity.

In October 2011, Israel's fifth medical school opened in Safed, housed in a renovated historic building in the centre of town that was once a branch of Hadassah Hospital.

The Azrieli Faculty of Medicine opened in 2011 as an extension of Bar-Ilan University, created to train physicians in the Upper Galilee region. The schools conducts clinical instructions in six hospitals in the region:

Baruch Padeh Medical Center
Ziv Medical Center
Western Galilee Hospital
EMMS Nazareth Hospital
 The Holy Family Hospital 
Mazra Mental Health Center 

The Livnot U'Lehibanot program in Safed provides an open, non-denominational atmosphere for young Jewish adults that combines volunteering, hiking and study with exploring Jewish heritage.

Sharei Bina is a program for women who have just finished high school and want to study in a seminary in Safed for one year that teaches young women who want to experience Jewish spirituality in the mystical city of Safed. In comparison to other seminaries, Sharei Bina includes the study of the shekhinah and other Kabbalist rituals in the learning.

On March 8, 2021, the Israeli Prime-Minister Benjamin Netanyahu announced that Israel is to establish its 10th university in Safed, after a growing need for a university in the northern district of Israel. Plans have been in place to establish a University in the Galilee since 2005, but no progress was made until 2015 when Netanyahu vowed to start working on the project during a Galilee Conference.

Culture 

Artists' colony
In the 1950s and 1960s, Safed was known as Israel's art capital. An artists' colony established in the old Arab quarter was a hub of creativity that drew artists from around the country, among them Yitzhak Frenkel, Yosl Bergner, Moshe Castel, Menachem Shemi, Shimshon Holzman and Rolly Schaffer. In honor of the opening of the Glitzenstein Art Museum in 1953, the artist Mane Katz donated eight of his paintings to the city. Today the area contains a large number of galleries and workshops run by individual artists and art vendors. There are several museums and galleries that function in the historical homes of major Israeli artists such as the Frenkel Frenel Museum and the Beit Castel gallery

Music
In the 1960s, Safed was home to the country's top nightclubs, hosting the debut performances of Naomi Shemer, Aris San, and other singers. Nowadays, 
Safed has been hailed as the klezmer capital of the world, hosting an annual Klezmer Festival that attracts top musicians from around the globe.

Museums
The Beit Hameiri museum documents Safed's Jewish community over the past 200 years.
The Museum of the Art of Printing displays the first Hebrew printing press.

Historic sites

Citadel Hill
The Citadel Hill, in Hebrew HaMetzuda, rises east of the Old City and is named after the huge Crusader and then Mamluk castle built there during the 12th and 13th centuries, which continued in use until being totally destroyed by the 1837 earthquake. Its ruins are still visible. On the western slope beneath the ruins stands the former British police station, still pockmarked by bullet holes from the 1948 war.

Old Jewish Quarter
Before 1948, most of Safed's Jewish population used to live in the northern section of the old city. Currently home to 32 synagogues, it is also referred to as the synagogue quarter and includes synagogues named after prominent rabbis of the town: the Abuhav, Alsheich, Karo and two named for Rabbi Isaac Luria: one Ashkenazi, the other Sephardi.

Mamluk-period buildings
Further south are two monumental Mamluk-period buildings:
 the Red Mosque with a khan (1276)
 the Mamluk mausoleum, now used by freemasons. The mausoleum was built for a Mamluk na'ib (governor) of Safed, Muzaffar ad-Din Musa ibn Hajj al-Ruqtay Musa Muzaffar al-Din ibn Ruqtay al-Hajj, who died in AH 762/AD 1360–61).

Southeast of the Artists' Quarter is the Saraya, the fortified governor's residence built by Zahir al-Umar (1689/90–1775).

A report about the "obliteration of non-Jewish historic sites in Safed" mentions a mausoleum, an ancient grave and an ancient mosque that was converted into a clubhouse.

Notable people

Twin towns — sister cities

Safed is twinned with:
 Erzsébetváros, Budapest, Hungary
 Guarda, Portugal
 Lille, France
 Nikopol, Bulgaria
 Palm Beach County, Florida, United States
 Toledo, Castile–La Mancha, Spain

Gallery

See also
List of clock towers – Safed has its own, the Ottoman clock tower of the "Saraya" (government house), inaugurated in 1900

Notes

References

Bibliography

External links

City Council website
zefat.net 
Tourist Information Center
Nefesh B' Nefesh Community Guide for Tzfat
 Survey of Western Palestine, Map 4:   IAA, Wikimedia commons; Safed on the PEF Map

 
Holy cities
Cities in Northern District (Israel)
Jewish pilgrimage sites
Crusader castles
Castles and fortifications of the Kingdom of Jerusalem
Castles and fortifications of the Knights Templar
Castles in Israel
Ancient Jewish settlements of Galilee
Ottoman clock towers
Clock towers in Israel
Holy cities of Judaism